John Crittenden Watson (24 August 1842 – 14 December 1923) was an admiral of the United States Navy.

Biography
Watson was born in Frankfort, Kentucky, on August 24, 1842, the grandson of Kentucky politician John J. Crittenden. He graduated from the United States Naval Academy on 15 June 1860. After tours in Susquehanna and Richmond, Watson was promoted to master on 19 September 1861 and joined Sabine. He distinguished himself in this ship when she went to the aid of the chartered government transport Governor off the coast of South Carolina on the night of 2–3 November 1861. Watson managed the cables and hawsers which held the two ships together in spite of a violent gale, allowing some 500 men—Marines and crew—to clamber from the foundering Governor to safety in Sabine. His commanding officer, Captain Cadwalader Ringgold, praised Watson for his "indefatigable exertions" and "utmost skill and efficiency" in keeping the two ships lashed together.

Promoted to lieutenant in July 1862, Watson later served as flag lieutenant to Rear Admiral David Farragut, who flew his flag in the steam sloop Hartford, and participated in the Battle of Mobile Bay. He was later wounded by a shell fragment during an engagement with a Confederate battery at Warrington, Florida.

After the war, Watson became a companion of the District of Columbia Commandery of the Military Order of the Loyal Legion of the United States, a military society of officers who had served in the Union armed forced during the Civil War.

Watson served in a number of sea and shore billets into the 1880s, including duty as executive officer of the steam sloop Alaska; the post of inspector of ordnance at the Mare Island Navy Yard, Vallejo, California; command of Wyoming when that warship carried the American exhibit to the Paris Exposition of 1878; and governor of the Naval Home at Philadelphia, Pennsylvania.

As a commodore, he hoisted his broad pennant in Newark (Cruiser No. 1) as Commander, Eastern Fleet, on 10 June 1898, shifting later to Oregon (Battleship No. 3). The battleship served as his flagship during the subsequent Battle of Santiago, Cuba, on 3 July 1898, in which the Spanish squadron under Admiral Pascual Cervera was destroyed.

In 1898 he became a veteran companion of the Military Order of Foreign Wars.

Promoted to rear admiral in 1899, he served as Commander in Chief, Asiatic Fleet, from 20 June 1899 into 1900 before returning to the United States to serve as President of the Naval Examining Board. Watson represented the United States at the coronation of King Edward VII of the United Kingdom in 1902.

Placed on the retired list in 1904, Rear Admiral Watson lived in retirement with his wife Elizabeth Anderson, with whom he had three boys, until he died at Washington, D.C., on 14 December 1923.

Namesake
During World War II, the U.S. Navy planned to name a destroyer  in honor of Rear Admiral Watson. However, due to more pressing wartime destroyer construction programs, the ship was never laid down, and her construction was canceled on 7 January 1946.

See also

References

External links
 history.navy.mil: John C. Watson
 
 John C. Watson Papers at the Library of Congress

Gallery

1842 births
1923 deaths
United States Navy admirals
United States Naval Academy alumni
Crittenden family